These are the Billboard magazine Dance/Mix Show Airplay number-one hits of 2018

See also
2018 in music
List of Billboard Rhythmic number-one songs of the 2010s
List of number-one dance singles of 2018 (U.S.)
List of number-one Billboard Dance/Electronic Songs

References

External links
Dance Airplay Chart (updated weekly)

2018
United States Dance Airplay